Yulis Gabriel Mercedes Reyes (born November 12, 1979 in Monte Plata, Monte Plata Province) is a Dominican taekwondo practitioner and Olympic medalist.

He won a silver medal in the – 58 kg class at the 2008 Summer Olympics in Beijing, after tying with Guillermo Pérez of Mexico, but losing by a judge's decision.

He carried the flag for his delegation at the 2012 Summer Olympics in London.  He was favored to win his county's third medal at these games.  He competed in the Men's 58 kg (flyweight).  He lasted one round and a half.  A bad move shattered the meniscus and the anterior cruciate ligament in his right knee. He kept fighting with evident pain, before he limped away in tears.

See also
 Dominican Republic at the 2004 Summer Olympics
 Dominican Republic at the 2008 Summer Olympics
 Dominican Republic at the 2012 Summer Olympics

Notes

References

External links
 
 
 
 

1979 births
Living people
Dominican Republic male taekwondo practitioners
Taekwondo practitioners at the 2004 Summer Olympics
Taekwondo practitioners at the 2007 Pan American Games
Taekwondo practitioners at the 2008 Summer Olympics
Taekwondo practitioners at the 2011 Pan American Games
Taekwondo practitioners at the 2012 Summer Olympics
Olympic taekwondo practitioners of the Dominican Republic
Olympic silver medalists for the Dominican Republic
Olympic medalists in taekwondo
Medalists at the 2008 Summer Olympics
Pan American Games gold medalists for the Dominican Republic
Pan American Games bronze medalists for the Dominican Republic
Pan American Games medalists in taekwondo
Central American and Caribbean Games gold medalists for the Dominican Republic
Competitors at the 2002 Central American and Caribbean Games
Competitors at the 2010 Central American and Caribbean Games
World Taekwondo Championships medalists
Central American and Caribbean Games medalists in taekwondo
Medalists at the 2011 Pan American Games
Mixed-race Dominicans